The Kronstadt Marine Plant, originally established  as 'Parokhodnyi mekhanicheskii z-d goroda Kronshtadta', is a shipbuilding and repair center. It became the main repair center for the Baltic Fleet around 1900. By 1914 there were two dry docks, but no building slips. Operational 1917–1920; one of three military plants in the 1930s that produced munitions and torpedoes; arms parts and munitions during wartime.

Currently part of the United Shipbuilding Corporation.

Notes

Bibliography

External links
 Official website

United Shipbuilding Corporation
Companies based in Saint Petersburg
Shipbuilding companies of the Soviet Union
Companies nationalised by the Soviet Union
Cultural heritage monuments in Saint Petersburg
Kronstadt